The Adams Avenue Bridge is a historic bridge in Philadelphia, Pennsylvania. It carries Adams Avenue over the Tacony Creek in Tacony Creek Park.

A two-lane, triple-span, closed-spandrel, filled stone arch bridge, built in 1901, it was listed on the National Register of Historic Places in 1988.

References

External links
Listing at BridgeHunter.com

Bridges completed in 1901
Bridges on the National Register of Historic Places in Philadelphia
Olney-Oak Lane, Philadelphia
Road bridges on the National Register of Historic Places in Pennsylvania
Stone arch bridges in the United States
Bridges in Philadelphia